Fragments of D-generation is the second album by the Italian melodic death metal band Disarmonia Mundi released by Italian label Scarlet Records in 2004. After numerous line-up changes, this album features Soilwork's Björn "Speed" Strid on vocals. The song, "Red Clouds" was chosen as their first video and was directed by bass player Mirco Andreis.

Track listing
 "Common State of Inner Violence" – 5:19  	
 "Morgue of Centuries" – 4:18  	
 "Red Clouds" – 5:20  	
 "Quicksand Symmetry" – 4:37  	
 "Swallow the Flames" – 3:48  	
 "Oceangrave" – 4:05  	
 "A Mirror Behind" – 5:35  	
 "Come Forth My Dreadful One" – 4:14  	
 "Shattered Lives and Broken Dreams" – 4:15  	
 "Colors of a New Era" – 4:59
 "Burning Cells" (Japan Bonus Track) - 4:39

Credits

Disarmonia Mundi
 Ettore Rigotti − guitars, drums, keyboards, clean vocals
 Claudio Ravinale − growl vocals, lyrics
 Mirco Andreis − bass

Guests
 Björn "Speed" Strid − vocals
 Guido Suardi - Artwork, all photography and retouching
 Benny Bianco Chinto - Vocals on tracks 1, 3, 4, 7 and 10
 Federico Cagliero - guitars, songwriting on (3, 4, 10), guitar solos on (11)
 Samantha Abbatangelo - layout, art direction, design and retouching

References

Disarmonia Mundi albums
2004 albums
Scarlet Records albums